The Australian cricket team toured the Caribbean from February to April 1999 to play four Tests and seven One Day Internationals (ODIs) against the West Indies. Australia additionally played three first-class matches, winning two and drawing one. The Test series was drawn 2–2 resulting in the Frank Worrell Trophy remaining in Australia. The ODI series was also drawn with three wins each and one tie. This was the first four-match series in the history of Test cricket to finish as a two-all draw. The only other four-match Test series, to finish with the same result was England at home to Pakistan in 2016.

Background
The West Indies Cricket Board (WICB) announced in June 1998 that Sabina Park would host the first Test – the first following the abandonment of the Test between England and the West Indies after just 62 deliveries in January 1998.

This was the 19th Test series between these two teams and the 16th time they were contesting the Frank Worrell Trophy. Australia last toured the West Indies in 1995 securing the trophy for the first time since 1976. Australia retained the trophy in 1996–97 winning the series 3–2. Since then, Australia won Test series at home against New Zealand and South Africa and away against South Africa, England and Pakistan. Their only loss came in their tour of India in 1998. Meanwhile, the West Indies were successful against India, Sri Lanka and England at home but lost away to Pakistan.

Immediately prior to this tour, Australia won a home Ashes series against England, and won an ODI tri-series against England and Sri Lanka. Australia's Test captain Mark Taylor initially indicated that he would continue to lead the side for this tour, but in February 1999 he announced his retirement. Steve Waugh, who had held the captaincy of the ODI side for 18 months, was appointed as the new Test captain with Shane Warne as his deputy. Conversely, the West Indies on their first tour of South Africa in the post-apartheid era had suffered their first 5–0 Test whitewash and lost the ODI series 6–1. Brian Lara led a player revolt against the WICB over pay and conditions and the tour was delayed by a week. He was stripped of the captaincy and later reinstated as skipper. Following the South African tour, the board announced that Lara would be retained as captain for the Australian series.

Summary
The West Indies continued their poor form in the opening match of the Test series, posting their lowest innings score of 51 and losing the match by 312 runs. They fought back in the second Test breaking their six-match losing streak with Lara scoring 213. The third Test was described by Steve Waugh as the best Test match he had ever played in. Lara led his team to a one-wicket victory with his second innings score of 153 not out rated by Wisden as the second-best innings in the history of Test cricket. Leg spinner Shane Warne was dropped for the final Test, which Australia won by 176 runs. This was the second-drawn series of the Frank Worrell Trophy with the 1981–82 series finishing at one-all.

Following the Test series, the two teams played in their first seven-match bilateral ODI series against each other. In a back-and-forth series which saw neither team win back-to-back matches, the series ended three games-all. These were the final ODI matches for both teams before the 1999 Cricket World Cup in England which Australia went on to win. Lara was rested due to a wrist injury for the final three matches with Jimmy Adams standing in as captain. The series was marred by poor crowd behaviour by the West Indian supporters. The fifth ODI ended in a tie after the crowd invaded the ground in scenes almost identical to the final ODI match between Pakistan and the West Indies at the same ground six years earlier. The WICB later apologised for the incident. The final ODI match was suspended for over an hour due to spectators throwing glass bottles and other debris onto the ground in protest at Sherwin Campbell being obstructed by Brendon Julian and being given run out. One of the bottles narrowly missed captain Steve Waugh. This mirrored a similar incident at the same ground in March 1979 during the second Supertest between WSC Australians and WSC West Indies. Midway through the final day's play, the crowd threw bottles onto the ground after the controversial lbw dismissal of Roy Fredericks. Play did not resume and the match ended in a draw. Prior to the final ODI match, the former West Indian captain Carl Hooper announced his retirement from international cricket.

Squads

A fifteen-man squad for the West Indies was announced on 1 March 1999 for the first Test. Ahead of the second Test the WICB named a thirteen-man squad which excluded Corey Collymore and Phil Simmons. Roland Holder was injured during the 1st Test and was replaced by Daren Ganga. Mervyn Dillon was dropped for Nehemiah Perry. Collymore was then brought back into the squad to replace Reon King who injured his shoulder. The thirteen man squad announced ahead of the third Test saw Adrian Griffith, Carl Hooper and Shivnarine Chanderpaul coming in as replacements for Suruj Ragoonath, Daren Ganga and Lincoln Roberts. Hooper was unavailable for first two Tests with his child being sick and Chanderpaul was unavailable due to injury. The only change to the West Indies squad for the fourth Test was Wavell Hinds being brought in for Shivnarine Chanderpaul who did not play in the third Test due to his right shoulder injury.

For Australia, the only change to the Test squad came ahead of the fourth Test when backup wicket-keeper Adam Gilchrist was called in as a possible replacement for Ian Healy due to issues with his calf muscles. Healy however played in the final Test.

During the fourth Test, Adam Dale came down with pneumonia and returned to Australia for treatment. He was replaced by the One Day International squad with Andy Bichel. Before the second ODI, the squad was reduced to 14 with Bichel being removed.

Tour matches

3-day match: West Indies Board XI v Australians

4-day match: West Indies Board President's XI v Australians

4-day match: West Indies A v Australians

Test series

1st Test

2nd Test

3rd Test

4th Test

ODI series

1st ODI

2nd ODI

3rd ODI

4th ODI

5th ODI

6th ODI

7th ODI

References

Notes

External links
 Series home at ESPN Cricinfo

1999 in Australian cricket
1999 in West Indian cricket
1998-99
International cricket competitions from 1997–98 to 2000
West Indian cricket seasons from 1970–71 to 1999–2000